Jecheon is a city in North Chungcheong Province, South Korea.  The city is a major railway junction or a transportation mecca, served by the Jungang, Chungbuk and Taebaek Lines. Jecheon has scenic surroundings and several tourist spots like the Uirimji Reservoir, Cheongpung Lake and Cheongpung Cultural Properties complex. It is also the home of Semyung University.

The city's name derives from the Korean words je (which means "dam") and cheon (which means "river").

Location
Jecheon City is located in the northern part of North Chungcheong Province bordering Mungyeong City to the south, while Wonju City and Yeongwol-gun, which are located in Gangwon Province, are to the north. It is well known for its mountains and lake environments. Jecheon is well known as the "healing city". A wide variety of traditional medical and herbal products and therapies are available, attracting people all over Korea to visit the city.

Climate
Jecheon has a monsoon-influenced humid continental climate (Köppen: Dwa) with cold, dry winters and hot, rainy summers.

Tourism
Ten views in the city:
 Uirimji
 Bakdaljae
 Woraksan Mountain
 Cheongpoong cultural town, Hoban
 Geumsusan
 Yonghagugok
 Songgyegyegok
 Oksunbong
 Taksajeong
 Baeronseongji

Twin towns – sister cities

Jecheon is twinned with:

 Hualien City, Taiwan
 Pasay, Philippines
 Qichun County, China
 Spokane, United States
 Zhangshu, China

Notable people from Jecheon
 Kim So-hui (Hangul: 김소희), South Korean Taekwondo practitioner
 Park Sang-ha (Hangul: 박상하), South Korean volleyball player
 Jung Woong-in (Hangul: 정웅인), South Korean actor
 Lee Sang-kyu (Hangul: 이상규), South Korean activist, labourer and politician
 Lee Byungryul (Hangul: 이병률), South Korean poet, television writer, and prose writer
 Choi Geum-jin (Hangul: 최금진), South Korean poet
 Uhm Jung-hwa (Hangul: 엄정화), South Korean singer, actress and dancer
 Hwiyoung (Real Name: Kim Young-kyun, Hangul: 김영균), singer, dancer, actor and K-pop idol, member of K-pop boygroup SF9
 Microdot and Sanchez, rappers, brothers, grew up in Auckland City, New Zealand.

See also
 List of cities in South Korea
 People Power Party (South Korea)

References

External links
 Jecheon city government home page

 
Cities in North Chungcheong Province